Barbara Jackson (born December 25, 1961) is an American attorney and jurist who was elected in 2010 to an eight-year term on the North Carolina Supreme Court.

Jackson moved to Wake County at the age of 3 and graduated Athens Drive High School in 1980. Jackson, an alumna of the University of North Carolina at Chapel Hill (bachelor's degree, 1984; J.D. degree, 1990) and Duke University (LL.M. 2014), has worked as a legal counsel for the state of North Carolina for most of her legal career, working in the office of Governor James G. Martin (1991–1992),  as an advocate for persons with disabilities (1992–1996), and as General Counsel to the North Carolina Department of Labor (2001–2004).

In 2004, Jackson was elected to an eight-year term on the North Carolina Court of Appeals, defeating incumbent judge Alan Thornburg in the statewide judicial elections. In 2010, Jackson was elected to a seat on the North Carolina Supreme Court that had been held by Edward Thomas Brady, who did not run for re-election. She defeated Robert C. Hunter, a colleague on the court of appeals, in the statewide judicial elections to win the seat. When she took office in January 2011, Jackson became the court's 96th associate justice and formed a 4-3 majority of female justices for the first time in the court's history. She lost a bid for a second term in the election of 2018 to Democratic attorney and civil rights activist Anita Earls.

References

External links
Official biography

1961 births
Living people
Duke University School of Law alumni
North Carolina Court of Appeals judges
North Carolina lawyers
Justices of the North Carolina Supreme Court
University of North Carolina School of Law alumni
North Carolina Republicans
21st-century American judges
Athens Drive High School alumni
21st-century American women judges